Estelita Rodriguez (July 2, 1928 – March 12, 1966) was a Cuban actress best known for her roles in many Westerns with Roy Rogers for Republic Pictures, as well as her role in Howard Hawks' Rio Bravo.

Early life and career
Rodriguez's career began in 1942 when she won a contract with Metro-Goldwyn-Mayer at the age of 14. She continued to go to MGM school in preparation to make a movie. However, MGM dropped her at the last minute, and Rodriguez went back to New York until 1945, when she signed a five-picture deal with Republic Pictures. The studio that same year cast her in her first film, Mexicana starring Tito Guízar, Constance Moore, and Leo Carrillo. Although that acting opportunity made her career take a better turn, Rodriguez did not enjoy making the movie, reportedly complaining, "Everyone treats me like a kid. I am a mother." She was subsequently cast in 1945 in  Along the Navajo Trail, her first Roy Rogers film, and then two years later with Rogers again in On the Old Spanish Trail. Before concluding her career with Republic in 1952, she appeared in a total of nine Roy Rogers productions, as well as in other projects for the studio. Later, Rodriguez worked in a few additional films for Paramount, MGM, and Embassy Pictures, including Rio Bravo in 1959 and Jesse James Meets Frankenstein's Daughter—her final Hollywood film—in 1966.

Personal life and death

During the days of her early career, Rodriguez married Mexican singer Chu-Chu Martinez; the date of their marriage is unknown. They had one child together, Nina (born 1946) and divorced in 1947. In January 1953, Rodriguez married actor Grant Withers; they divorced in 1955. Her third marriage was to Ismael Alfonso Halfss in 1956; they divorced in 1960. Her fourth and final marriage was to Dr. Ricardo A. Pego in 1961. They remained married until her death.

On March 12, 1966, Estelita Pego was found dead on the kitchen floor of her home near North Hollywood/Van Nuys, California at age 37. No autopsy was performed and her cause of death remains unknown. She is interred at San Fernando Mission Cemetery, Mission Hills, California.

Filmography

References

External links

 

Cuban film actresses
1928 births
1966 deaths
Burials at San Fernando Mission Cemetery
Western (genre) film actresses
20th-century Cuban actresses
Cuban emigrants to the United States